Tezozomoctli (1406–1483) was the tlatoani (ruler) of Tizic, a subdivision of the pre-Columbian Nahua state of Cuitlahuac, from the year 1 Reed (1415) until his death in the year 4 Reed (1483).

Notes

References

1406 births
1483 deaths
Tlatoque